Sarah Mae Cahill (born 1978) is an American model, actress, and beauty pageant titleholder. Originally from Waseca, Minnesota, she won her first state crown in 1995, when she became Miss Minnesota Teen USA.

Eight years later Cahill won the Miss Minnesota USA 2003 crown and competed for the Miss USA pageant. She also appeared in the Miss USA edition of NBC's Fear Factor.  Cahill was unplaced for the second time.

At the time of winning her pageant crown, Cahill was working as a flight attendant for Northwest Airlines. She has also worked as a professional model and has made appearances on Beverly Hills, 90210 and The Rosie O'Donnell Show. In 2007, she appeared on an episode of I Love New York. She also appeared as the blonde flight attendant who grabs the dance pole on the jet in Iron Man after offering the hot sake.

She also had an appearance in the popular show How I Met Your Mother.

Filmography

References

External links

TFTJ profile (accessed 14 June 2006)
Miss USA profile (accessed 14 June 2006)
Miss USA interview (accessed 14 June 2006)

Living people
1978 births
People from Waseca, Minnesota
Miss USA 2003 delegates
1996 beauty pageant contestants
20th-century Miss Teen USA delegates